The Amt of Calvörde is a historical Amt in the District of Helmstedt, Brunswick, in today's Saxony-Anhalt, Germany. It formed an exclave that was surrounded by the Province of Saxony, Prussia, and in 1944 it was moved to the District of Haldensleben, Province of Saxony. Its capital was Calvörde; it had a population of 4,600 (1933).

Municipalities in 1939:
 Berenbrock
 Calvörde
 Dorst
 Elsebeck
 Jeseritz
 Lössewitz
 Parleib
 Uthmöden
 Velsdorf
 Zobbenitz

Helmstedt (district)